Fred Hovey Allen (1845–1926) was an American Congregational clergyman and author, best known as the inventor of the first photogravure plates for art reproduction made in the United States.

Biography 
Fred Hovey Allen was born in Lyme, New Hampshire on October 1, 1845. He graduated from the Hartford Theological Seminary, and studied at Boston University and in Europe at the Universities of Berlin, Vienna, and Paris.

He died in Manhattan on December 26, 1926.

His writings include:
 Masterpieces of Modern German Art (1884)  
 Recent German Art (1885)    
 Grand Modern Paintings (1888)

References 

American Christian theologians
19th-century American inventors
1845 births
1926 deaths
Hartford Seminary alumni
Boston University alumni
People from Lyme, New Hampshire
Inventors from New Hampshire